Fred Fanning (5 November 1921 – 23 May 1993) was an Australian rules footballer who played for Melbourne in the Victorian Football League (VFL) who holds the record for most goals in a VFL/AFL match, with 18.

VFL career
Hailing from the Victorian Football Association (VFA) club Coburg, Fanning was a strongly built forward standing at 193 cm and weighing 102 kg. In September 1939, playing for Melbourne Seconds against Richmond in the Seconds' Grand Final, Fanning kicked 12 goals in a 29-point victory.
 
Fanning made his senior debut in 1940 and played in that year's Grand Final victory over Richmond. He topped the VFL's goalkicking charts in 1943 (62 goals), 1944 (87) and 1945 (67), a year in which he also won Melbourne's best and fairest award.

In Round 18, 1947, he kicked 18 goals, 1 behind, in a game against St Kilda, which remains the record for most goals in a VFL/AFL match to this day; this was coincidentally Fanning's final appearance in a VFL match. He kicked 97 goals for the 1947 VFL season, the highest in his VFL career.

Post-VFL
Fanning joined the Hamilton Football Club in the Western District Football League as captain-coach in 1948, after being offered 3 to 6 times the salary he was receiving at Melbourne (accounts vary). This appointment caused a split in the club, and the Hamilton Imperials were founded.

Fanning held the Western District record for most goals in a game by kicking 22 against Heywood in 1949. The following year he kicked 20 goals against Penshurst. He kicked a Western District record of 151 goals in a season in 1952. He finished his football career at Coleraine in 1953.

References

External links 

Melbourne Football Club players
Australian rules footballers from Geelong
Keith 'Bluey' Truscott Trophy winners
VFL Leading Goalkicker Medal winners
Coleraine Football Club players
Hamilton Football Club players
1921 births
1993 deaths
Melbourne Football Club Premiership players
One-time VFL/AFL Premiership players